Rudolf Eugène Pierre Albertus "Rudy" Ballieux (17 September 1930 – 22 October 2020) was a Dutch immunologist.

Career
Ballieux was born on 17 September 1930 in Pekalongan in the Dutch East Indies. After attending the Hogere Burgerschool he studied chemistry and medical science at Utrecht University. He earned his doctor title in 1963 under F.L.J. Jordan.

Ballieux was professor of Clinical Immunology at Utrecht University between 1977 and 1991. In the later part of his career Ballieux did research on the influence of stress on the immune system. 

Ballieux was the first Van Loghem Laureate lecturer of the Dutch Society for Immunology in 1981. He was elected a member of the Royal Netherlands Academy of Arts and Sciences in 1991.

He died in Doorn on 22 October 2020, aged 90.

References

1930 births
2020 deaths
Dutch immunologists
Members of the Royal Netherlands Academy of Arts and Sciences
People from Pekalongan
Utrecht University alumni
Academic staff of Utrecht University